Prince Ludwig Philipp Maria Friedrich Joseph Maximilian Antonius Ignatius Lamoral of Thurn and Taxis, full German name: Ludwig Philipp Maria Friedrich Joseph Maximilian Antonius Ignatius Lamoral, Prinz von Thurn und Taxis, also Louis Philippe (2 February 1901, Regensburg, Kingdom of Bavaria – 22 April 1933, Schloss Niederaichbach, Niederaichbach, Bavaria, Germany) was a member of the House of Thurn and Taxis and a Prince of Thurn and Taxis by birth.

Family
Ludwig Philipp was the fourth child and son of Albert, 8th Prince of Thurn and Taxis and his wife Archduchess Margarethe Klementine of Austria.

Marriage and issue
Ludwig Philipp married Princess Elisabeth of Luxembourg, fifth child and daughter of William IV, Grand Duke of Luxembourg and his wife Infanta Marie Anne of Portugal, on 14 November 1922 in Hohenburg, Bavaria, Germany. Ludwig Philipp and Elisabeth had two children:

Prince Anselm of Thurn and Taxis (14 April 1924 – 25 February 1944)
Princess Iniga of Thurn and Taxis (25 August 1925 – 17 September 2008)

Ludwig Philipp of Thurn and Taxis studied law at the Julius-Maximilians University of Würzburg. He was a member of the catholic fraternity KDStV Cheruscia Würzburg (Cartellverband der katholischen deutschen Studentenverbindungen).

Ancestry

References

1901 births
1933 deaths
Princes of Thurn und Taxis
People from Regensburg
German Roman Catholics
University of Würzburg alumni
Burials at the Gruftkapelle, St. Emmeram's Abbey